The Boomerang Range, (at ), is a narrow mountain range on the western side of the Skelton Glacier and Skelton Névé, Antarctica. The range is curved like a boomerang, and extends generally north–south for about 25 km. It was mapped and named in 1957 by geologists in the New Zealand party of the Commonwealth Trans-Antarctic Expedition (CTAE), 1956–58.

See also
Allemand Peak

References

Mountain ranges of Oates Land